Kameyama Station is the name of two train stations in Japan:

 Kameyama Station (Hyōgo)
 Kameyama Station (Mie)